Romanikha is a rural locality (a settlement) in Krasnovishersky District, Perm Krai, Russia. The population was 71 as of 2010. There are 2 streets.

Geography 
Romanikha is located 34 km north of Krasnovishersk (the district's administrative centre) by road. Zagovorukha is the nearest rural locality.

References 

Rural localities in Krasnovishersky District